Tatar Bayjeq (also Romanized as Tātār Bāyjeq; also known as Bāyjeq) is a village in Nezamabad Rural District, in the Central District of Azadshahr County, Golestan Province, Iran. At the 2006 census, its population was 813, in 188 families.

References 

Populated places in Azadshahr County